Terror Firmer is a 1999 American comedy horror film directed by Lloyd Kaufman, written by Douglas Buck, Patrick Cassidy, and Kaufman, and starring Will Keenan, Alyce LaTourelle, and Kaufman. The film was produced by the Troma Entertainment company, known for distributing campy exploitation films.

The film features several direct references to the previous Troma films, such as The Toxic Avenger, and includes famous Troma props, like the 'Penis Monster' (referred to, in the film, as "Thor, the God of Love") and a severed leg. It was loosely based, in that respect, on Kaufman and Gunn's book All I Need to Know about Filmmaking I Learned from the Toxic Avenger.

Plot
The film is the story of a New York low-budget film crew, led by their insane and egotistical blind film director, Larry Benjamin, who is trying to create a work of art. In addition to the typical trials and travails of a Troma set, the crew is preyed upon by a sexually conflicted, bomb-toting serial killer. Among the large poorly paid film crew, the movie centers mostly on production assistant Jennifer, who struggles to do her job while deciding between the two men in her life; the strait-laced boom operator Casey, and the rebellious special effects operator Jerry. The love triangle intensifies as the dead bodies mount with increasingly brutality. At the climax, the entire film crew bands together (both physically and sexually) against the mortal threat in their midst.

Cast

 Will Keenan as Casey
 Alyce LaTourelle as Jennifer
 Lloyd Kaufman as Larry Benjamin
 Trent Haaga as Jerry
 Debbie Rochon as Christine
 Ron Jeremy as Casey's father
 Charlotte Kaufman as Audrey Benjamin
 Sheri Wenden as the mysterious woman
 Darko Malesh as Nikolai
 Yaniv Sharon as Yeager the P.A.
 Gary Hrbek as Toddster
 Greg 'G-Spot' Siebel as Ward
 Mario Díaz as D.J.
 Joe Fleishaker as Jacob Gelman
 Mo Fischer as Andy
 Reverend Jen Miller as Tina the script girl
 Trace Burroughs as Edgar Allan
 Sean Pierce as Moose
 Barry Brisco as Stephen
 Kerri Kenney as Woman with Eyeball in Her Cleavage
 Theo Kogan as Theodora
 Eli Roth as a Shocked Onlooker
 Lemmy as himself
 Joe Lynch as Clothespin Boy
 Édouard Baer as French Cool Cat
 Joseph Malerba as French Cool Cat
 Trey Parker and Matt Stone (uncredited) as Hermaphrodites

Production
Terror Firmer is the first Troma release to be edited digitally on Avid.

The 'Morton Springer Show' sequence was based on the experience Lloyd Kaufman had on the Morton Downey Jr. Show.

The end credits states, "A VERY SPECIAL THANK YOU TO: The New York City Police Department, for their unstinting cooperation and invaluable help throughout every part of this production." The documentary The Making of Terror Firmer shows the police clashing with the production on several instances (one of which involved the police revoking the crew's filming permit).

The movie includes songs from notable punk bands, including NOFX (Stranger than Fishin'), the Vandals (Idea for a Movie), Bouncing Souls (Argyle), Blood for Blood (My Time is Yet to Come), Anti-Flag (Someone's Gonna Die Tonight), and The Melvins (Horn Bearer).  A soundtrack for the movie was released by Go Kart records in October 2000.

Alternate versions
 The 2-Disc Special Edition gives the viewer a choice to watch the Director's Unrated Cut or to watch the Director's Unrated Cut with even more deleted scenes put back into the film. This makes the film's running time 123 minutes.
 The 98-minute release R-rated version features several boxes that contain the words "CENSORED", covering various body parts (whether nude or dismembered). Additionally, for the heavier cut scenes, the movie freezes and a window appears on the screen with Kaufman explaining or comically re-enacting what was supposed to go on in the scene. The voices of characters uttering profanity at some moments are replaced by an obviously mismatched voice that says the accepted version of the word. Finally, some body parts are replaced by images of animals (e.g. a pussy cat).
 The unrated director's cut runs 114 minutes. The heavily edited R-rated version runs 98 min.

References

External links
 
 
 
 
 

1999 horror films
1990s comedy horror films
1999 LGBT-related films
American comedy horror films
American LGBT-related films
1990s English-language films
Films directed by Lloyd Kaufman
American independent films
American serial killer films
Troma Entertainment films
American splatter films
LGBT-related comedy horror films
1999 films
Films about filmmaking
1999 independent films
1999 comedy films
1990s American films